The Jazz Singer is a 1927 film, the first feature-length motion picture with talking sequences.

The Jazz Singer may also refer to:
 A jazz singer
 Jazz singing
 The Jazz Singer (play), a 1925 Broadway play produced by Max Gordon and  A. L. Erlanger
 The Jazz Singer (1952 film) starring Danny Thomas
 The Jazz Singer (1959 film), a TV production starring Jerry Lewis
 The Jazz Singer (1980 film) starring Neil Diamond
 The Jazz Singer (soundtrack), the  1980 remake's soundtrack